The Ponte de Santa Clara (Portuguese for Santa Clara Bridge) is a t-section and haunched girder bridge completed and opened on 30 October 1954, crossing the Mondego River leading to the town square of Coimbra. It was inaugurated on the same date it opened by prime minister António de Oliveira Salazar for a total cost of 15,000 contos (€ 75,000).

References 

Buildings and structures in Coimbra